KAGH (800 AM, "Oldies Radio 800") is a radio station licensed to serve Crossett, Arkansas, United States The station is owned by Crossett Radio and licensed to Peggy S. Medlin's Ashley County Broadcasters, Inc.

The station airs an oldies music format. Most of the station's programming comes from the satellite-delivered Classic Hits service of Westwood One.

The station was assigned the KAGH call letters by the Federal Communications Commission.

History of call letters
The call letters KAGH were previously assigned to an AM station in Pasadena, California. It began broadcasting July 22, 1948, on 1300 kHz with 1 KW power (daytime).

References

External links
KAGH official website
Crossett Radio

AGH
Oldies radio stations in the United States
Ashley County, Arkansas
AGH
Radio stations established in 1951
1951 establishments in Arkansas